The 1981 UCI Road World Championships took place on 30 August 1981 in Prague, Czechoslovakia.

Results

Medal table

List of professional riders 
NB : List of teams by number of riders then alphabetically.
The maximum number of riders per team was 12, plus the titleholder Bernard Hinault.
The number of riders at the start was 112 with 69 finishers (43 abandoned)

External links 

 Men's results
 Women's results
  Results at sportpro.it

 
UCI Road World Championships by year
UCI Road World Championships 1981
UCI Road World Championships
Uci Road World Championships, 1981
UCI Road World Championships